Cai Wu (born October 1949) is a retired Chinese politician and a former Minister of Culture of the People's Republic of China.

Biography
Cai Wu was born in Gansu Province. During the Cultural Revolution, Cai was forced to leave his home in the Wudu region of Gansu.  He first went to Gaotai county, and then worked in the coal mines of Shandan county.  At the same time, he worked as a communications officer for the Gansu Daily newspaper.

In October 1976, Cai was transferred to the Gansu coal authority, and became the body's political affairs cadre.  After retaking the National College Entrance Examination, Cai entered Peking University in 1978.  He majored in international politics, and taught at the international relations school after graduation.

In 1983, Cai joined the Communist Youth League of China, and served as the head minister of the League's Central Ministry of International Communication, before rising to become a member of the League's Central Standing Committee, and the person in charge of national youth outreach.

In 1995, Cai became an analyst at the International Department Central Committee of CPC, and in the same year rose to the position of assistant secretary of the department.  In 1997, he became the deputy minister of the department.  In August 2005, Cai became the head of the Information Office of the State Council.  He was appointed as Minister of Culture in March 2008.

He retired after having reached the age of 65 from his post as Minister of Culture in December 2014.

Cai Wu is a member of the 17th and 18th Central Committees of the Chinese Communist Party, and a professor of international relations at Renmin University. He also has a Doctorate degree in Law.

References

External links
Searchable biography of Cai Wu @ China Vitae
Biography of Cai Wu

 
 

 
 

 
 

1949 births
Chinese Communist Party politicians from Gansu
Living people
Ministers of Culture of the People's Republic of China
People from Longnan
People's Republic of China politicians from Gansu
Peking University alumni
Academic staff of Renmin University of China